La Nany is a Chilean sitcom based on the U.S. TV series The Nanny. It was aired from 2005 to March 2006, when it was followed by Casado con Hijos, the Chilean version of Married... with Children.

Plot 
Eliana "Nany" Tapia is a woman who comes to work in the mansion of a wealthy family, in the suburbs of La Dehesa, Santiago, after being fired from a bridal shop in the Florida Center Shopping Mall. The family she works for is formed by the widower Max Valdivieso, his three children, Catalina, Sofía, and Tomás, and his butler Bruno. Max's assistant, Loreto, has a rivalry against Eliana and Bruno. She will do everything possible to try to fire them. In some cases, Eliana and Loreto and will have to work together to get out of trouble. Loreto is very fond of Max and the two both have a relationship at the beginning of the series.

Cast 
Alejandra Herrera as Eliana Melina Tapia Cárdenas
Alex Zisis as Maximiliano Valdivieso
Fernando Larraín as Bruno Órdenes, the Butler
Francisca Castillo as Loreto López de Lérida
Camila López as Catalina Valdivieso
Maximiliano Valenzuela as Tomás Valdivieso
Vania Vilas as Sofía Valdivieso
Grimanesa Jiménez as Silvia Cárdenas
Carmen Gloria Bresky as Valeska Patricia Torres
Nelly Meruane as Yaya

References

External links 
 

2005 Chilean television series debuts
2006 Chilean television series endings
The Nanny
Chilean television sitcoms
Mega (Chilean TV channel) original programming
Spanish-language television shows
Chilean television series based on American television series